The Bavarian Cavalry Division (Bayerische Kavallerie-Division) was a unit of the Royal Bavarian Army, part of the German Army, in World War I. The division was formed on the mobilization of the German Army in August 1914. The division was disbanded in 1919, during the demobilization of the German Army after World War I. The division was raised and recruited in Bavaria.

Combat chronicle 
The division was formed on mobilization for World War I on 2 August 1914. It was assigned to III Cavalry Corps, which preceded 6th Army on the Western Front. Between November 1914 and January 1915, the division took part in occupation duties in Belgium. After a period of training in Germany, it transferred to the Russian Front from April 1915 to November 1917, when it moved to Romania. In April 1918, the division moved to the Ukraine / Crimea.

A more detailed combat chronicle can be found at the German-language version of this article.

Order of Battle on mobilisation 
On formation, in August 1914, the component units of the division were:

1st Bavarian Cavalry Brigade (from I Bavarian Corps District)
1st Royal Bavarian Heavy Cavalry "Prince Charles of Bavaria"
2nd Royal Bavarian Heavy Cavalry "Archduke Francis Ferdinand of Austria"
4th Bavarian Cavalry Brigade (from II Bavarian Corps District)
1st Royal Bavarian Uhlans "Emperor William II, King of Prussia"
2nd Royal Bavarian Uhlans "King"
5th Bavarian Cavalry Brigade (from III Bavarian Corps District)
1st Royal Bavarian Chevau-légers "Emperor Nicholas of Russia"
6th Royal Bavarian Chevau-légers "Prince Albrecht of Prussia"
Horse Artillery Abteilung of the 5th Royal Bavarian Field Artillery "King Alfons XIII of Spain" Regiment
1st Bavarian Cavalry Machine Gun Detachment
Bavarian Cavalry Pioneer Detachment
Bavarian Cavalry Signals Detachment
Bavarian Light Wireless Station 1
Bavarian Light Wireless Station 2
Bavarian Heavy Wireless Station 3
Bavarian Heavy Wireless Station 4
Bavarian Cavalry Motorised Vehicle Column 1

See: Table of Organisation and Equipment

Late World War I organization 
From 25 November 1917 to 21 March 1918, the division was without any cavalry; and from 20 April 1918, it only had two Cavalry Brigades.
4th Bavarian Cavalry Brigade became independent on 3 July 1917

Allied Intelligence rated the Division as 4th Class (of 4). The organisation in 1918 was:

1st Bavarian Cavalry Brigade
1st Royal Bavarian Heavy Cavalry "Prince Charles of Bavaria"
2nd Royal Bavarian Heavy Cavalry "Archduke Francis Ferdinand of Austria"
5th Bavarian Cavalry Brigade
1st Royal Bavarian Chevau-légers "Emperor Nicholas of Russia"
6th Royal Bavarian Chevau-légers "Prince Albrecht of Prussia"
Horse Artillery Abteilung of the 5th Royal Bavarian Field Artillery "King Alfons XIII of Spain" Regiment
1st Bavarian Cavalry Machine Gun Detachment
Bavarian Cavalry Pioneer Detachment
Bavarian Cavalry Cyclist Detachment
30th Bavarian Ambulance Company
Attached
Landsturm Infantry Battalion Glatz (VI/9)

See also 

Bavarian Army
German Army (German Empire)
German cavalry in World War I
German Army order of battle (1914)

Notes

References

Bibliography 
 
 
 
 

Cavalry divisions of Germany in World War I
1914 establishments in Germany
1919 disestablishments in Germany
Military units and formations established in 1914
Military units and formations disestablished in 1919
Military units and formations of Bavaria